Act One, Inc. is a Christian, non-profit organization established in January 1999 by Barbara Nicolosi. A training program for aspiring filmmakers, Act One provides in-class instruction from professionals, internships, and practical experience. The program is divided into two branches: the Writing Program (with several advanced tiers for mentorship-driven workshops) and the Executive Program, which trains students in the development and production side of the business. Both programs typically take place side-by-side in the summer.

Act One is located on Beachwood Drive in Hollywood, California.

History 

Act One was formed in January 1999 as an educational outreach to writers of the Christian entertainment fellowship Inter-Mission; initial funding was provided by the Stratford Foundation. A core group of Hollywood professionals came together with Act One's first class in hopes of passing on their experience. According to their promotional material, Act One's goal is not to produce explicitly religious entertainment, but movie and TV projects that respect and serve the global audience.

Act One was first stationed at Hollywood Presbyterian Church before relocating to their current location on Beachwood Drive.

Academics

Writing Program for Screen and Television
The Writing Program was created the same year as Act One, and until 2009 was an intensive one-month course devoted to teaching the rigors of screenwriting; a TV track was added in 2002, allowing a select group of writing students to participate in a mockup of a real TV writer's room.

Producing and Entertainment Executive Program 
The 14-month Certificate Program provides students a strong foundation in producing for mainstream screen and television, and prepares them for entry-level careers in the entertainment industry, which focus on becoming a producer or entertainment executive. Students in the 14-month Certificate Program get a broad overview of all aspects of the business of Hollywood, along with specialized instruction in creative development, physical production, and marketing and distribution. The 14-Month Certificate Program kicks-off with the two-week Producinhg Seminar, then an eight-week internship at a studio or production company along with a Producing Workshop.  Concentration in specialized areas of producing come next, and The Producer’s Spiritual Journey runs concurrently and rounds out the program.

References

External links
 Official website

Christian organizations established in the 20th century
Film organizations in the United States
Internship programs
Non-profit organizations based in Los Angeles
Christian organizations established in 1999
1999 establishments in California